Alexandra is a rural municipality located in Queens County, Prince Edward Island, Canada.

Demographics 

References 

Communities in Queens County, Prince Edward Island
Rural municipalities in Prince Edward Island